Thane (also known as Thana, the official name until 1996) is a metropolitan city in Maharashtra, India. It is situated in the north-eastern portion of the Salsette Island. Thane city is entirely within Thane taluka, one of the seven talukas of Thane district; also, it is the headquarters of the namesake district.

Located on the northwestern side of the state of Maharashtra, the city is an immediate neighbour of Mumbai city proper and a part of the Mumbai Metropolitan Region.

Etymology and other names 

The name Thane has been variously Romanised as Tana, Thana, Thâṇâ, and Thame. Ibn Battuta and Abulfeda knew it as KukinTana; Duarte Barbosa as TanaMayambu. Before 1996, the city was called 'Thana', the British spelling of the city, until it was replaced with the more-local name.

History 
A copper plate dating to AD 1078 was discovered near the foundations of Thane Fort in 1787. A land grant from Arikesara Devaraja, lord of Tagara, wherein he addresses the inhabitants of a city called "Sri Sthanaka". for a long time it was military training and recruitment center of Maratha empire

British occupied Salsette Island, Thana Fort, Fort Versova and the island fort of Karanja in start of First Anglo-Maratha War but after short time it were recaptured by forces of Haripant Phadke and Tukoji Holkar it remained under control of Maratha empire until Second Anglo-Maratha War

Transport

Railways 
Thana was the terminus for the first ever passenger train in Asia. On 16 April 1853, the passenger train service was inaugurated between Bori Bunder (Bombay) and Thane. Covering a distance of 34 km (21 mi), it was hauled by three locomotives: Sahib, Sindh and Sultan.

Thane is connected with neighbouring suburbs through Central and Trans-Harbour Line Suburban railway network. Thane is a railway junction for the Thane-Vashi & Panvel Harbour Line and Central Line. It is one of the busiest stations in India and handles 654,000 passengers daily.

Metro
As of January 2021, the MMRDA, the nodal agency for building 300 km of vast Metro network, has proposed a plan to build an elevated depot for three Metro lines : 4 (Wadala-Thane-Kasarvadavali), 4A (Kasarvadavali-Gaimukh), 10 (Gaimukh-Shivaji Nagar) and 11 (Wadala-General Post Office, CSMT) at one stop. This depot is proposed at Mogharpada, Thane. The total project cost is estimated to be ₹ 596.60 crore.

As of 2019, Wadala and Thane are being connected through a Metro line.

On 26 August 2015, the MMRDA sanctioned ₹354 billion for 118 km Mumbai metro network. This includes a 40-km Wadala-Ghatkopar-Thane-Kasarvadavali Metro-4 corridor via Wadala GPO and R.A.Kidwai Marg costing ₹120 billion.

Thane Municipal Transport (TMT) 
Thane Municipal Corporation started its own transport service on 9 February 1989, known as Thane Municipal Transport (TMT). TMT provides services the city interior and Mumbai suburbs like Mulund, Andheri, Mira road, Nala Sopara, Bhiwandi, Vasai, Virar, Borivali, Vashi, Airoli, Ghatkopar, Dadar, Bandra, BKC, Bhayandar, Kalyan, and Panvel, among others.

Navi Mumbai Municipal Transport (NMMT) 

Navi Mumbai Municipal Transport (NMMT) ply in direction towards Vashi and Navi Mumbai. It goes through Airoli, Turbe etc. Most of NMMT buses ply in Thane from the Kalwa area. NMMT connects city of Thane to various parts of Navi Mumbai. NMMT operates buses to Airoli, Rabale, Mahape, Panvel, Vashi, Ghansoli, Nerul, CBD Belapur etc.

Mira Bhayandar Municipal Transport (MBMT)  

Mira-Bhayandar Municipal Transport (MBMT) started from 2006. The buses ply from Dahisar Check naka towards Versova [Thane] Check naka. So till now majority of MBMT buses can be taken up at the Check naka only. MBMT has started new services to Thane City from January 2010.

Vasai-Virar Municipal Transport (VVMT) 

VVMT is the newest public transport, operational from October 2013. The area of Thane City was connected to the Vasai & Virar by the VVMT.

Future of transport in Thane
A light rail network covering 42 km has been proposed in three phases. In the first phase, consultants have suggested connectivity between Balkum and Kolshet via Naupada. It will be 16.05 km long with 14.65 km elevated, and only 1.4 km on the surface, and 11 stations in all.

Geography

Climate 
Thane has a tropical monsoon climate that borders on a tropical wet and dry climate. The overall climate is equable with high rainfall days and very few days of extreme temperatures.

In Thane, temperature varies from 22 °C to 36 °C. Winter temperatures can fall to 12 °C at night while summer temperatures can rise to over 40 °C at noon. The lowest daytime temperatures are witnessed during the peak of the summer monsoon in July and August when temperatures can drop to about 25 °C. Out of total rainfall, 80% rainfall is experienced during June to October. Average annual rainfall is 2000–2500 mm and humidity is 61–86%, making it a humid zone.

Lakes

Sports 
Cricket is the most popular sport in this settlement. Dadoji Kondadev Stadium, a sports arena of cricket is present in the city. Thane comes under jurisdiction of Mumbai Cricket Association, the governing body for cricket in Mumbai. Its players play for Mumbai cricket team in Indian domestic cricket.

Demographics 
The population of Thane according to the 2011 census is 1,886,941. The average literacy rate of Thane city is 91.36 percent for where male and female literacy was 94.19 and 88.14 percent respectively. The sex ratio of Thane city is 882 females per 1000 males. Child sex ratio is 900 girls per 1000 boys. Total children (0–6) in Thane city are 186,259 as per Census India report on 2011. There were 98,017 boys while 88,242 are girls. Children form 10.24% of total population of Thane City.

The dominant language spoken in Thane is Marathi. Around 70% of population speaks Marathi. Some of the East Indian families in the Khatri ward of Thane still speak Portuguese. About 1,800 of India's approximately 5,000 Jews live in Thane.

Education

Schools 

 D.A.V. Public School
 Hiranandani Foundation School
 Holy Cross Convent High School
 Little Flower High School, Thane
 New Horizon Scholars School, Thane
 Podar International School
 S.E.S. High School and Junior College
 Smt. Sulochanadevi Singhania School
 Sri Ma Vidyalaya, Patlipada, Thane
 St. John the Baptist High School, Thane
 Vasant Vihar High School

Colleges and Institutes 

 A. P. Shah Institute of Technology
 Dr. V. N. Bedekar Institute of Management Studies And Law
 Institute of Management and Computer Studies
 KC College of Engineering
 Rajiv Gandhi Medical College
 Rustomjee Academy for Global Careers
 Vidya Prasarak Mandal's Polytechnic

Notable people 

Eknath Shinde – Present incumbent Chief minister of Maharashtra 
Malaika Arora  Film actress, dancer
Amrita Arora  Film actress
Jitendra Awhad  Indian politician
Hruta Durgule  Indian television actress
Anand Dighe  Former politician, popular by honorific "Dharmaveer", was unit chief of Shiv Sena in Thane district
Poorva Gokhale  TV television actress
Suhas Joshi   Film, TV actor 
Umesh Kamat   Film–television actor
Kavita Lad   TV, film actress
Sanjay Kelkar    Politician
Prajakta Koli   Youtuber
Pramod Mahajan  Indian politician
Priya Marathe   TV actress
Sanjeev Naik   Politician
Anand Paranjpe  Politician 
Prakash Paranjape  politician
Ravindra Phatak   Politician 
Diana Pinto  Miss India America 2009 
Satish Pradhan   Local politician 
Prithvi Shaw  Professional cricketer

Shrikant Shinde  Indian politician
Pratap Sarnaik   Politician 
Anant Tare  Local politician
Laxmi Narayan Tripathi – Indian LGBT activist
Rajan Vichare  Local politician
Bal Thackeray  former Shiva sena politician

See also 
 2013 Thane building collapse in Shil Phata
 Thane Railway Station
 Transportation in Thane
 Trans Thane Creek
 List of schools in Thane
 Chandanwadi
 Line 4 (Mumbai Metro)
 List of towns and villages in Thane district
 Thane Creek

References

External links 

 Thaneweb.com—The city portal
 Official Website of Thane Forest Circle 
 ThaneMahapailika.com —Thane Municipal Corporation (Local Body)
 Official website of Thane City
 Thane District

 
Cities and towns in Thane district
Cities in Maharashtra